Maiji may refer to:

Maiji District, district in Tianshui, Gansu, China
Maiji Shan, mountain in Gansu, China, the cite of Maijishan Grottoes